The 1987–88 season was the 42nd season in FK Partizan's existence. This article shows player statistics and matches that the club played during the 1987–88 season.

Friendlies

Players

Squad information

Competitions

Yugoslav First League

Yugoslav Cup

UEFA Cup

First round

See also
 List of FK Partizan seasons

References

External links
 Official website
 Partizanopedia 1987-88  (in Serbian)

FK Partizan seasons
Partizan